Duan may refer to:

 Duan (surname), a Chinese surname
 Duan dynasty, the ruling dynasty of the Dali Kingdom
 Duan tribe, pre-state tribe during the era of Sixteen Kingdoms in China
 Duan language, spoken on the Laotian–Vietnamese border
 Duan, mark of level in Chinese martial arts
 Lê Duẩn, the General Secretary of the Communist Party of Vietnam from 1959 until his death in 1986, and leader of Vietnam from 1969 to 1986
 Du'an Yao Autonomous County, in Guangxi, China
 Zaiyi, Prince Duan (1856-1922), Manchu prince and statesman during the late Qing dynasty
 Duan railway station, Paschim Medinipur district, West Bengal